Donald Harnum is an American basketball coach and college athletics administrator. Harnum served as head men's basketball coach at Rider University from 1997 to 2005, compiling a record of 126–103. After serving his tenure as basketball coach, Harnum was later named athletic director at Rider in 2005.

Head coaching record

References

External links
Rider Broncs bio

Year of birth missing (living people)
Living people
American men's basketball coaches
Basketball coaches from Pennsylvania
College men's basketball head coaches in the United States
Rider Broncs athletic directors
Rider Broncs men's basketball coaches
Susquehanna River Hawks men's basketball players
The College of New Jersey alumni